The World University Rowing Championship is a competition sponsored by the International University Sports Federation (FISU) and sanctioned by the International Rowing Federation (FISA), which was first held in 1984.

Championships

See also
 Rowing at the Summer Universiade

External links
 https://www.fisu.net/sports/championships-world-cups-sports/rowing

References

Rowing
Rowing competitions